Aleksey Kriventsov or Alyaksey Kriwentsow (born 28 March 1974) is a Belarusian swimmer. He competed in the men's 100 metre breaststroke event at the 1996 Summer Olympics.

References

External links
 

1974 births
Living people
Belarusian male swimmers
Olympic swimmers of Belarus
Swimmers at the 1996 Summer Olympics
Place of birth missing (living people)